Ambassador Habibullah Khan  Tarzi (born 1896) was head of the Afghan Delegation to Paris from 1923 to 1924. He served in that post to increase diplomatic/economic relations between France and Afghanistan. Tarzi would go on to play critical roles in the Afghan foreign affairs as the Temporary Representative to France from 1928 to 1929, and Japan from 1933 to 1939. Habibullah Khan Tarzi became the Deputy Minister of Foreign Affairs for Afghanistan from 1932 to 1933. He took a few years off after that, however, and stayed with his family.

It was not until 1946, when he was named as a Temporary Representative to China, that Habibullah Khan Tarzi would return to international politics. After less than a year in China, he would present his credentials to President Harry S. Truman as Afghanistan's Ambassador Extraordinary and Plenipotentiary to the United States of America. After developing a very friendly relationship with President Truman, Habibullah Khan Tarzi would stay at that post in Washington, D.C. from 1946 to 1953. Shortly after President Dwight D. Eisenhower came to office, Habibullah Khan Tarzi left the United States and returned to Kabul.

Habibullah Khan Tarzi and his wife Shahira Begum Tarzi had four sons along with three daughters.

See also
Tarzi
Politics of Afghanistan

Pashtun people
Afghan diplomats
1896 births
Ambassadors of Afghanistan to France
Ambassadors of Afghanistan to Japan
Ambassadors of Afghanistan to China
Ambassadors of Afghanistan to the United States
Year of death unknown
Government ministers of Afghanistan